Natalie Nunn (born December 26, 1984) is an American reality television personality, known for being a castmate on the fourth season of the Bad Girls Club in 2009–10. She subsequently appeared on Bad Girls Club season 13 as well as Hair Battle Spectacular. She was also a contestant on the second season of Love Games: Bad Girls Need Love Too. Nunn also participated on the first season of Bad Girls All-Star Battle. In 2018, she participated in the reality show Celebrity Big Brother.

Early life and career
Nunn was born on December 26, 1984, in Concord, California, to parents Karen and Earl Nunn. Nunn has one sibling, her brother Ronald Nunn. Nunn is of White and African American descent. She grew up in Pleasanton where her mother had taken two jobs to raise them. She attended Aragon High School in San Mateo. She also ran on her school's track team and competed in the 2002 Junior Olympics. She attended University of Southern California where she played a defender on the Trojans women's soccer team, making five appearances in 2004.

Career

2009–2011: Bad Girls Club and Love Games
Nunn rose to fame when she was cast on the fourth season of the Bad Girls Club. The season premiered on December 1, 2009, to the highest number of viewers in Oxygen's history, at the time. Nunn was removed from the show in Episode 11, after a physical altercation with castmates Amber McWha, Lexie Woltz, and Kendra James during a trip to Santa Barbara, California. Her success on season 4 caused Oxygen to bring her back for future appearances on seasons 5 and 6 of the show.

Nunn was a competitor on second season of the Bad Girls Club spinoff, Love Games: Bad Girls Need Love Too. This was hosted by former bad girl Tanisha Thomas. The season ran from April 18, 2011, to June 13, 2011. While on the show, Nunn and two other former bad girls competed in a series of challenges to find a guy to date. Nunn placed second on the show, losing to Lea Beaulieu from the fifth season. Nunn then made a cameo appearance on the third season of the series. The episode aired on January 16, 2012.

2012: Tanisha Gets Married, Bridezillas, and The Tea Party
In 2012, Nunn was featured on the Oxygen series Tanisha Gets Married. She served as a Bridesmaid at her friend and former fellow Bad Girl Tanisha Thomas's wedding, along with Florina Kaja and Amber Meade. The series premiered on May 7, 2012, and the finale aired on July 2, 2012.

Nunn's own wedding was also broadcast on television. She met her current husband, Arizona Rattlers Arena Football League player Jacob Payne, while making an appearance in Detroit, Michigan, in September 2011. The couple started officially dating in October 2011. Payne proposed to Nunn while vacationing in Negril, Jamaica in April 2012. They were married on May 5, 2012. Their wedding was broadcast on the WE tv show Bridezillas. Nunn was featured on season 9 and her story is shown over the last three episodes of the season. Nunn and Payne discussed their experiences on Bridezillas, as well as details about their married life on The Bill Cunningham Show.

Nunn hosts a Filmon TV show known as The Tea Party with Natalie Nunn, on which she holds interviews, discusses current events that are both domestic and worldwide, and talks about some of her own projects and experiences. The first episode of the show aired on June 22, 2012. The show's co-hosts are socialite Milyn "Mimi" Jensen from Bad Girls Club Season 11 and transgender activist Gizelle. It is broadcast in LA on channels 32 and 64 every Monday and Wednesday at 4 pm PST. In December 2012, Nunn filmed another Bad Girls Club special with Season 8 cast member Camilla Poindexter. The special is titled "Making it to the Mansion, ATL", and shows Nunn and Poindexter providing commentary about the casting for Bad Girls Club: Atlanta.

2013–2015: Continued Bad Girls Club Spin Off Success and Autobiographies
"Making it to the Mansion, ATL" aired on January 8, 2013, at 8 pm. Eastern Time, with commercial promotions being released January 2, 2013. The special was watched by approximately 596,000 viewers. Nunn filmed a "Top Ten OMGs" special for Bad Girls Club seasons six through ten with Camilla Poindexter. Nunn was cast to be on the new reality competition series Bad Girls All-Star Battle on Oxygen, which had a record-breaking 1.73 million viewers and made history for being Oxygen's highest rated television premiere series. She placed fifth in the competition. Nunn co-hosted "Making it to the Mansion, Miami", the casting special for Bad Girls Club: Miami II, along with Poindexter. The special aired on August 6, 2013.

Nunn has released a book titled Turn Down For What which was released on May 28, 2013. It is an autobiographical book and guide for women. In October 2013, Nunn went to Brazil to film the music video to "Na Atividade" by Bonde da Stronda. Nunn release her second book, a tell-all titled Straight Like That in November 2013. Adriane Schwartz of Star reviewed the book, saying, "Natalie Nunn definitely knows how to dish the dirt. This book will blow your expectations. It is a reminder that Natalie truly does run L.A.".

In 2014, Nunn was cast on Bad Girls Club: Redemption. She was removed in episode 4, for starting a physical altercation with Raquel "Rocky" Santiago.

2015–present: Further television appearances 
Nunn participated in several WeTV shows, such as Marriage Boot Camp, "Where Are They Now?". She also starred in Lifetime's reality show Mother/Daughter Experiment with her mother Karen Nunn. Nunn is also executive producing the Zeus originals Baddies and Bad Boys.

Personal life
Nunn dated Olamide Faison from 2003 to 2009. Nunn and Arizona Rattlers football player Jacob Payne married in May 2012, and the marriage was aired on two episodes of Bridezillas, on October 28 and November 4, 2012. Nunn revealed on November 12, 2014, that the couple were expecting their first child, in February 2015, she revealed that she had had a miscarriage. In late 2016, she announced that she was pregnant again. On April 26, 2017, she gave birth to a daughter.

Filmography

References

1984 births
Living people
African-American television personalities
American people of Brazilian descent
American people of Puerto Rican descent
Participants in American reality television series
People from San Mateo, California
University of Southern California alumni
Bigg Boss contestants
Big Brother (franchise) contestants
American women's soccer players
Soccer players from California
Women's association football defenders
USC Trojans women's soccer players
21st-century African-American people
21st-century African-American women
20th-century African-American people
20th-century African-American women